SDFC may refer to:

Salthill Devon F.C.
Shepshed Dynamo F.C.
Sime Darby F.C.
Stone Dominoes F.C.
Swan Districts Football Club